The 2011 Alabama A&M Bulldogs football team represented Alabama A&M University as a member of the East Division of the Southwestern Athletic Conference (SWAC) during the 2011 NCAA Division I FCS football season. Led by tenth-year head coach Anthony Jones, the Bulldogs compiled an overall record of 8–4 with a mark of 7–2 in conference play, sharing SWAC East Division title with Alabama State and Southern. Alabama A&M advanced to SWAC Football Championship Game by virtue of a head-to-head win over the Alabama State, while Southern was ineligible for postseason play due to low Academic Progress Rate (APR) scores. The Bulldogs lost the SWAC title game to Grambling State, 16–15. Alabama A&M played their home games at Louis Crews Stadium in Huntsville, Alabama.

Schedule

References

Alabama AandM
Alabama A&M Bulldogs football seasons
Alabama AandM Bulldogs football team